Komga Hospital is a small Provincial government funded hospital for the Great Kei Local Municipality area in Komga, Eastern Cape in South Africa.

In 1997 the old hospital in Rhodes Avenue closed and moved to the new hospital situated in Victoria Road which was built by Public Works.

The hospital departments include Emergency department, Maternity and Paediatrics wards, Out Patients Department, Medical Services, Pharmacy, Anti-Retroviral (ARV) treatment for HIV/AIDS, X-ray Services, Laundry Services, Kitchen Services and Mortuary.

References 
 Eastern Cape Department of Health website - Amathole District Hospitals

Hospitals in the Eastern Cape
Amathole District Municipality